The Nuclear Whales Saxophone Orchestra were a group of six American saxophonists who played as a saxophone ensemble in recordings and live performance. They were based in Santa Cruz, California and were active from about 1980 till some time in the 1990s. The group was notable for its contrabass saxophone, which is 203 centimetres tall with a 43-centimetre-diameter bell. It is a very low-pitched instrument that is very rarely heard. The instrument, played by the group's leader and founder Don Stevens, was formerly owned by Robert Seaton of Louisville, Kentucky, a noted civil engineer and amateur musician who played the sax on WHAS big band programs in the 1920s and 1930s.  Mr. Seaton found the contrabass saxophone in a shop in Newark, New Jersey in the 1960s.   Inscriptions on the instrument indicate that it was produced for the US Army Band in 1902.  Mr. Seaton sold the instrument to the Nuclear Whales sometime before his death in 1990.

On 29 September 2003 the band played a concert at the concert hall of the National Library, Beijing, China. In 2002 they conceived the concept of 500 saxophone players from the US and abroad joining 500 Chinese saxophone players to play an event on the Great Wall of China. However, this has yet to come off, and it appears that the group has disbanded.

Discography
1986 - Nuclear Whales 
1989 - Whalin' 
1991 - Thar They Blow 
1992 - Gone Fission
1997 - Isotopia
1999 - Fathom This: A Retrospective

References

Saxophone organizations
American jazz ensembles from California
Santa Cruz, California
Organizations based in California